is a House of Lords case in English land law and relates to proprietary estoppel in the multi-property developer context.  The court of final appeal awarded the project manager £150,000 on a quantum meruit basis for unjust enrichment because Yeoman's Row had received the benefit of his services without paying for that.  The court refused to find or acknowledge a binding contract, prior arrangement with a third party or promise (such as would be necessary for proprietary estoppel or for a constructive trust), overturning a £2m award on the basis of a possible lien arising from a promise over the property. The court found a non-binding agreement in principle, entirely subject to the owner's final say to take into account for example their view of the market; this was the basis on the facts on which the parties were proceeding.

Lord of Appeal in Ordinary, Lord Walker, with whom the other four Lords agreed adjudged that Cobbe "ran a commercial risk with his eyes open. This was commerce."

Facts
Mr Cobbe, a project manager/developer, claimed that the landowner Yeoman's Row Ltd had sat by and encouraged him to go to great expense in obtaining planning permission for a development, and should not be able to resile from an agreement in principle for the development site's sale. Yeoman's Row Ltd owned Knightsbridge land with 13 flats at 38-62 Yeoman's Row, London, SW3 2AH. They wanted to knock them down and build six terraced houses. One of the directors orally agreed with Mr Cobbe he would
at his own expense apply for planning to demolish the existing flats and put up the six-house terrace
after planning permission, and getting vacant possession the company would sell him the freehold for £12m
Mr Cobbe would develop the property as per the permission
the six houses would be sold and half the proceeds in excess of £24m would be given over.

Both knew nothing was, as yet, binding. Cobbe, regardless, spent a lot of time and effort between 2002 and 2004 applying for planning. By late 2003 the company had decided to pull out, and to ask for more money up front, but still deliberately gave Cobbe the impression that they would continue. Mr Cobbe got planning in March 2004, and the value was rising so fast it had increased by another £4m without work having even begun. Mrs Lisle-Mainwaring then said she wanted £20m, to be paid up front. He claimed breach of contract. The company claimed this was doomed to fail, because of LPMPA 1989 s 2.  He claimed alternatively proprietary estoppel, constructive trust and/or unjust enrichment.

Etherton J found on proprietary estoppel in Mr Cobbe's favour, and awarded £2m, equal to half of the increase in value of Yeoman Row's freehold caused by the grant in the planning permission. The Court of Appeal: Mummery, Dyson  and Sir Martin Nourse, upheld that decision.

Judgment
The House of Lords held Mr Cobbe had no proprietary estoppel claim, nor had he acquired an interest under a constructive trust. However he did have a claim for unjust enrichment, because Yeoman's Row had received the benefit of his services without paying for him. He was awarded £150,000, which reflected the application expenses, and a reasonable fee for professional services.

Lord Hoffmann agreed with Lord Scott.

Lord Scott gave the following judgment.

Lord Walker noted that in Gillett, the young farm manager did not take any legal advice and believed the assurances to be binding, whereas in the commercial context, a business person will have access to advice, and the focus is not on intangible legal rights, but on tangible property one expects to get. A domestic claimant does not reflect on potential litigation. He asked, ‘would it be conscionable for Mrs Lisle-Mainwaring to withdraw (subject only to reimbursement) at a stage when 99% of the work necessary to obtain planning permission had been done, and success was virtually certain, but unconscionable to do so once success had actually been achieved?’ This shows the risk Mr Cobbe took on. But he ran a commercial risk with his eyes open. This was commerce.

Lord Brown and Lord Mance concurred.

Considered in
Dowding v Matchmove Ltd [2016] CA
Benedetti v Sawiris [2013] SC (E) (England and Wales)

Distinguished in
Thorner v Major [2009] HL (E) (England and Wales)

See also

English contract law
English land law

Notes

External links
House of Lords judgment
Times Law Report

English contract case law
English property case law
House of Lords cases
2008 in case law
2008 in British law
English land case law